Matthieu Yannick Bemba (born 3 March 1988) is a Guadeloupean former professional footballer who played as a midfielder.

Career
In August 2011 Bemba signed a contract with FC Emmen which plays in the second division of the Netherlands.

In September 2018, Bemba joined Cypriot club ASIL Lysi. He left the club again at the end of the season.

References

External links
 
 

1988 births
Living people
French people of Guadeloupean descent
Guadeloupean footballers
French footballers
Footballers from Paris
Association football midfielders
Guadeloupe international footballers
Eerste Divisie players
Cypriot First Division players
Cypriot Second Division players
II liga players
FC Emmen players
Ermis Aradippou FC players
Ethnikos Achna FC players
Nea Salamis Famagusta FC players
Radomiak Radom players
ASIL Lysi players
Guadeloupean expatriate footballers
Guadeloupean expatriate sportspeople in the Netherlands
Expatriate footballers in the Netherlands
Guadeloupean expatriate sportspeople in Poland
Expatriate footballers in Poland
Guadeloupean expatriate sportspeople in Cyprus
Expatriate footballers in Cyprus